The Ivy Club, often simply Ivy, is the oldest eating club at Princeton University, and it is "still considered the most prestigious" by its members.  It was founded in 1879 with Arthur Hawley Scribner as its first head. Ivy is one of the "Big Four" eating clubs at Princeton (the others are Tiger Inn, University Cottage Club, and Cap and Gown Club), the four oldest and most prestigious on campus.

Club culture

The club is described by F. Scott Fitzgerald in This Side of Paradise (1920) as "detached and breathlessly aristocratic".  A more recent account described Ivy as the "most patrician eating club at Princeton University" where members "eat at long tables covered with crisp white linens and set with 19th-century Sheffield silver candelabra, which are lighted even when daylight streams into the windows."

Membership

The club was one of the last to admit women, resisting the change until spring 1991 after a lawsuit had been brought against the Ivy Club, Tiger Inn, and Cottage Club by the Princeton student Sally Frank and her lawyer Nadine Taub. The members of each class are selected through the bicker process, a series of ten screening interviews, which are followed by discussions amongst the members as to whom of the remaining to admit.  Current undergraduate members host regular "Roundtable Dinners" featuring talks by faculty and alumni.

Clubhouse

The first clubhouse was Ivy Hall, a brownstone building on Mercer Street in Princeton that still stands.  It had been constructed by Richard Stockton Field in 1847 as the home for the Princeton Law School, a short-lived venture that lasted from 1847 to 1852.  From the time of its founding until its incorporation in 1883, the club was generally known as the "Ivy Hall Eating Club."

In 1883 the club purchased an empty lot on Prospect Avenue, which was a country dirt road at the time.  Ivy erected a shingle-style clubhouse in 1884 on what is today the site of Colonial Club.  The clubhouse was remodeled and extended in 1887-88.  Following Ivy's move to new quarters across Prospect Avenue some ten years later, its second clubhouse was used by Colonial before being sold and moved to Plainsboro Township, New Jersey.

Ivy's third and current clubhouse was designed in 1897 by the Philadelphia firm of Cope & Stewardson. In 2009, the club completed its most significant renovation to date. The expansion added a second wing to the facility, changing the club's original L-shaped layout to a U.  Designed by Demetri Porphyrios, the new wing includes a two-story Great Hall and a crypt to provide additional study space.

Notable alumni

The following is a list of some notable members of the Ivy Club:

Hobey Baker (1914) – World War I fighter pilot, member of the Hockey Hall of Fame and U.S. Hockey Hall of Fame
James A. Baker III (1952) – Chief of Staff for Ronald Reagan; Secretary of Treasury and Secretary of State for George H. W. Bush
Lem Billings (1939) – confidante and "first friend" of President John F. Kennedy who was Kennedy's freshman-year roommate at Princeton
Joshua B. Bolten (1976) – White House Chief of Staff and Office of Management and Budget director under George W. Bush
Philip Bobbitt (1971) – constitutional law scholar and author of The Shield of Achilles: War, Peace, and the Course of History
Lauren Bush-Lauren (2006) – fashion model and niece of George W. Bush
Joey Cheek (2011) – speed skater who won gold and silver medals in the 2006 Winter Olympics and co-founder and president of Team Darfur
Leonard S. Coleman, Jr. (1971) – president of the National League
Frank Deford (1962) – author and sports commentator
Richard B. Fisher – philanthropist and chairman of Morgan Stanley
 Moira Forbes—president and publisher, ForbesWoman
Bill Ford (1979) – Ford Motor Company
Thomas F. Gibson – first political cartoonist of USA Today and Director of Communication under Ronald Reagan
John Marshall Harlan II (1920) – Associate Justice, United States Supreme Court
Frederick Hitz – Inspector General of the Central Intelligence Agency
Ellie Kemper (2002) - American actress, comedian, and writer
Arthur Krock – four-time Pulitzer Prize–winning journalist
A.B. Krongard (1953) – executive director of the CIA
Jim Leach (1964) – U.S. Congressman from Iowa and chairman of the National Endowment for the Humanities
Blair Lee I (1880) – United States Senator from Maryland
Blair Lee III (1938) – Governor of Maryland
Michael Lewis (1982) – author of Moneyball and Liar's Poker
Breckinridge Long (1904) – U.S. diplomat in the administrations of Woodrow Wilson and Franklin Delano Roosevelt
Allan Marquand (1874) – logician whose Marquand diagram was a forerunner of the Karnaugh map
Richard King Mellon – financier, banker, and philanthropist who led the urban renewal of Pittsburgh, Pennsylvania
John Aristotle Phillips –  entrepreneur specializing in political campaigns who became famous for attempting to design a nuclear weapon while a student.
John Rawls (1931) – political philosopher, author of A Theory of Justice, originator of the concepts of original position and veil of ignorance
Laurance Rockefeller (1932) – venture capitalist, philanthropist and environmentalist
Randall Rothenberg (1978) – president and CEO of the Interactive Advertising Bureau
Saud bin Faisal bin Abdul Aziz (1964) – Saudi Arabian Foreign Minister
Arthur Hawley Scribner (1881) – first head of the eating club and president of publisher Charles Scribner's Sons
Booth Tarkington (1893) – Pulitzer Prize–winning novelist
Jim Thompson (1928) – OSS officer and Thai silk entrepreneur who famously and mysteriously disappeared in Malaysia in 1967 
Terdema Ussery – president and CEO of the Dallas Mavericks professional basketball team
Rodman Wanamaker – arts patron, aviation pioneer, and founder of the Professional Golfers' Association of America (PGA)
Woodrow Wilson – U.S. President, 1913–1921 (Associate Graduate Member) 
John Gilbert Winant – Governor of New Hampshire and U.S. Ambassador to the United Kingdom
Frank G. Wisner (1961) – public servant and diplomat who served as U.S. Ambassador to Zambia, Egypt, the Philippines, and India.
Jacob Candelaria-New Mexico state senator, first openly gay man elected to the New Mexico Legislature and civil rights attorney.

References

External links
Official Ivy Club Website 
History and culture of the clubs, at Princeton's official site.
Further information on the renovation from James Bradberry Architects website
At Ivy Club, A Trip Back to Elitism  from the New York Times

Ivy Club
Jacobean architecture in the United States
Jacobethan architecture
Historic district contributing properties in Mercer County, New Jersey
Secret societies in the United States